Pierre Fallon (24 September 1912, Namur, Belgium - 20 September 1985, Calcutta, India) was a Belgian Jesuit priest, missionary in India, Professor of French literature at the University of Calcutta. In 1950 he founded the dialogue centre Shanti Bhavan (with Robert Antoine) in Calcutta; in 1960 the similar Shanti Sadan in North Calcutta; and later took charge of Shanti Nir.

Education
Fallon entered the Society of Jesus in 1930, and came to Calcutta, India in 1935. He obtained Indian citizenship in 1950. He held a licentiate in Indology from the University of Louvain, a licentiate in philosophy, a licentiate in theology, and was the first Jesuit to obtain an MA in Bengali philology from Calcutta University.

Work
He founded Shanti Bhavan with Robert Antoine in 1950, and contributed much to make it a living centre of intercultural and interfaith dialogue.

Ten years later he founded a similar Shanti Sadan in a much poorer and crowded area of North Calcutta, and later, after the sudden death of Louis Winckelmans took charge of Shanti Nir (1978), in the southern suburbs of the city. He was an educationist of renown, but also took charge of charitable work for the famine-stricken and refugees.

For 25 years he was a much appreciated and highly respected professor of French literature at the University of Calcutta, where he also became a member of the senate and the academic council. He also taught at St. Xavier's College, Calcutta. He was much in demand as a public orator in Bengali, French and English. But his heart was in translations from the Bible and other texts for Christian worship in Bengali. His "Glossary of Bengali Religious Terms" (1945) had prepared him for the task of translating biblical and liturgical texts. He was deeply involved also in interfaith dialogue. The last words he typed before his fatal heart attack summed up his entire life-work: "Dialogue with Persons of Other Faiths..." That was in September 1985: Pierre Fallon was in fact preparing a text for the forthcoming visit of John-Paul II in Calcutta (February 1986).

Bibliography

Primary bibliography
Christianity in Bengal in Studies in the Bengal Renaissance edited by Atulchandra Gupta (1958), revised and enlarged by Jagannath Chakavorty, Jadavpur, Calcutta: National Council of Education, 1977.
Glossary of Bengali Religious Terms. [See R. De Smet, "Foreword", Religious Hinduism, 4th rev. edition, ed. R. De Smet and J. Neuner (Mumbai: St Pauls, 1997) 17–18.]
New Testament. Translation into Bengali. [See R. De Smet, "Foreword", Religious Hinduism, 4th rev. edition, ed. R. De Smet and J. Neuner (Mumbai: St Pauls, 1997) 17–18.]
Mass Ritual. Translation into Bengali. [See R. De Smet, "Foreword", Religious Hinduism, 4th rev. edition, ed. R. De Smet and J. Neuner (Mumbai: St Pauls, 1997) 17–18.]
"Introduction: A Christian Approach to Non-Christian Religions". Religious Hinduism: A Presentation and Appraisal. 3rd rev. edition. Ed. R. De Smet and J. Neuner. Allahabad: St Paul Publications, 1968. 15–22.
"God in Hinduism: Brahman, Paramātman and Bhagavān". Religious Hinduism: A Presentation and Appraisal. 3rd rev. edition. Ed. R. De Smet and J. Neuner. Allahabad: St Paul Publications, 1968. 73–81.
"The Gods of Hinduism". Religious Hinduism: A Presentation and Appraisal. 3rd rev. edition. Ed. R. De Smet and J. Neuner. Allahabad: St Paul Publications, 1968. 82–94.
"Image Worship". Religious Hinduism: A Presentation and Appraisal. 3rd rev. edition. Ed. R. De Smet and J. Neuner. Allahabad: St Paul Publications, 1968. 172–182.
"Bhagavata Purana and Bhakti Currents". Religious Hinduism: A Presentation and Appraisal. 3rd rev. edition. Ed. R. De Smet and J. Neuner. Allahabad: St Paul Publications, 1968. 236–245.
"Doctrinal Background of the Bhakti Spirituality". Religious Hinduism: A Presentation and Appraisal. 3rd rev. edition. Ed. R. De Smet and J. Neuner. Allahabad: St Paul Publications, 1968. 246–254.
"Ramakrishna, Vivekananda and Radhakrishnan". Religious Hinduism: A Presentation and Appraisal. 3rd rev. edition. Ed. R. De Smet and J. Neuner. Allahabad: St Paul Publications, 1968. 287–295.
"The Present Situation". (In collaboration with R. Antoine.) Religious Hinduism: A Presentation and Appraisal. 3rd rev. edition. Ed. R. De Smet and J. Neuner. Allahabad: St Paul Publications, 1968. 308–320.
"Introduction: A Christian Approach to Religious Hinduism". Religious Hinduism. 4th rev. edition, ed. R. De Smet and J. Neuner. Mumbai: St Pauls, 1997. 23–30.
"God in Hinduism: Brahman, Paramātman, Īśvara and Bhagavān". Religious Hinduism. 4th rev. edition. Ed. R. De Smet and J. Neuner. Mumbai: St Pauls, 1997. 108–116.
"The Gods of Hinduism". Religious Hinduism. 4th rev. edition. Ed. R. De Smet and J. Neuner. Mumbai: St Pauls, 1997. 117–129.
"Image Worship". Religious Hinduism. 4th rev. edition. Ed. R. De Smet and J. Neuner. Mumbai: St Pauls, 1997. 220–230.
Bhāgavata Purāṇa and the Great Bhakti Currents". Religious Hinduism. 4th rev. edition. Ed. R. De Smet and J. Neuner. Mumbai: St Pauls, 1997. 292–302.
"Doctrinal Background of the Bhakti Spirituality". Religious Hinduism. 4th rev. edition. Ed. R. De Smet and J. Neuner. Mumbai: St Pauls, 1997. 303–313.
"Śrī Rāmakrishna, Swāmi Vivekānanda and Sarvepalli Rādhākrishnan". Religious Hinduism. 4th rev. edition. Ed. R. De Smet and J. Neuner. Mumbai: St Pauls, 1997. 357–374.

References

1912 births
1985 deaths
20th-century Belgian Jesuits
20th-century Indian Jesuits
Belgian Indologists
People who lost Belgian citizenship
People with acquired Indian citizenship
University of Calcutta alumni
Academic staff of the University of Calcutta
Belgian emigrants to India